Wayne Locke is a Welsh former professional darts player.

Darts career

1981
On 14 January 1981, Lock played in the BDO World Darts Championship, losing in the first round to Rab Smith winning a total of £300. Later in the year on 23 August, Lock played in the British Professional Championship but lost again in the first round to Alan Glazier winning a total of an unknown amount.

1989
On 1 January 1989, Lock made a comeback and played in the BDO British Open, but lost to Eric Bristow winning a total of £20.

World Championship Results

BDO
 1981: Last 32: (lost to Rab Smith 1–2)

External links
Profile and stats at the Darts Database

Welsh darts players
Living people
British Darts Organisation players
1956 births